Ynysybwl and Coed-y-cwm is a Community in Rhondda Cynon Taf, Wales in the United Kingdom, comprising the villages of Ynysybwl and Coed-y-Cwm.

The community is governed by a community council.

References

Communities in Rhondda Cynon Taf